Odorrana (commonly known as the odorous frog) is a genus of true frogs (Ranidae) from East Asia and surrounding regions. Many of these frogs inhabit fast-flowing mountain streams, and they typically have a remarkably pointed snout, as evidenced by common names like tip-nosed frog and scientific names like nasica or nasutus ("with a nose").

Systematics and taxonomy
Odorrana has a confusing taxonomic and systematic history. Most species placed here were initially placed in Rana. Some were considered to belong in Amolops and Huia instead, and yet again others were separated as Eburana. The most extreme proposal was to merge Odorrana into Huia.

In the early 21st century, molecular phylogenetic studies established that the systematic confusion was due to widespread convergent evolution between Amolops, Huia and Odorrana, which actually represent quite distinct lineages of Raninae. This necessitated some taxonomic changes, especially affecting Huia. It was also found that Odorrana is a rather close relative of Rana (which includes Lithobates nowadays) – possibly the most closely related living lineage. And while it is not completely certain that Odorrana is in fact a distinct genus, the available evidence points towards this being so.

Initial studies have revealed what seems to be several clades of Odorrana, which are sometimes considered subgenera. But few species have had their DNA sequence data sampled, and that the convergent evolution is liable to obscure relationships if assessed by morphology alone:
 A number of very basal species, including O. bacboensis, O. chapaensis, Ishikawa's Frog (O. ishikawae) and perhaps others do not seem to be particularly close to any of the larger groups or each other.
 A very robustly-supported clade containing the type species O. margaretae as well as at least O. andersonii, O. daorum O. grahami and O. hmongorum.
 A minor but quite distinct lineage containing O. absita, O. khalam and perhaps others. Namely O. hejiangensis and O. schmackeri might belong here, or represent another minor and distinct lineage.
 A large group, quite likely a clade, containing the Amami Tip-nosed Frog (O. amamiensis), O. banaorum, O. chloronota, Hose's Frog (O. hosii), O. livida, O. morafkai, O. megatympanum, the Ryukyu Tip-nosed Frog (O. narina), O. supranarina, O. swinhoana, O. tiannanensis, O. utsunomiyaorum and probably others. The specialized lineage encompassing the Long-snout Torrent Frog (O. nasica), the Concave-eared Torrent Frog (O. tormota), O. versabilis, and maybe some more species also belongs here.

Species

 Odorrana absita
 Odorrana amamiensis – Amami tip-nosed frog
 Odorrana andersonii
 Odorrana anlungensis
 Odorrana aureola 
 Odorrana bacboensis
 Odorrana banaorum
 Odorrana bolavensis
 Odorrana cangyuanensis
 Odorrana chapaensis
 Odorrana chloronota
 Odorrana dulongensis 
 Odorrana exiliversabilis
 Odorrana fengkaiensis
 Odorrana geminata
 Odorrana gigatympana
 Odorrana grahami
 Odorrana graminea
 Odorrana hainanensis
 Odorrana hejiangensis
 Odorrana hosii – Hose's frog
 Odorrana huanggangensis
 Odorrana indeprensa (Bain & Stuart, 2005)
 Odorrana ishikawae – Ishikawa's frog
 Odorrana jingdongensis
 Odorrana junlianensis
 Odorrana khalam
 Odorrana kuangwuensis
 Odorrana kweichowensis
 Odorrana leporipes
 Odorrana lipuensis
 Odorrana livida
 Odorrana lungshengensis
 Odorrana macrotympana
 Odorrana margaretae
 Odorrana mawphlangensis
 Odorrana monjerai
 Odorrana morafkai
 Odorrana mutschmanni Pham, Nguyen, Le, Bonkowski, and Ziegler, 2016 
 Odorrana nanjiangensis Fei, Ye, Xie & Jiang, 2007
 Odorrana narina – Ryukyu tip-nosed frog
 Odorrana nasica – Long-snout torrent frog (formerly in Amolops)
 Odorrana nasuta
 Odorrana orba
 Odorrana rotodora
 Odorrana schmackeri
 Odorrana sinica
 Odorrana splendida
 Odorrana supranarina
 Odorrana swinhoana
 Odorrana tianmuii
 Odorrana tiannanensis
 Odorrana tormota – Concave-eared torrent frog 
 Odorrana trankieni
 Odorrana utsunomiyaorum
 Odorrana versabilis
 Odorrana wuchuanensis
 Odorrana yentuensis
 Odorrana yizhangensis
 Odorrana zhaoi

In addition, the Phu Luang cliff frog (presently Huia aureola) might belong in Odorrana too.

Footnotes

References

  (2007): Paraphyly of Chinese Amolops (Anura, Ranidae) and phylogenetic position of the rare Chinese frog, Amolops tormotus. Zootaxa 1531: 49–55. PDF fulltext
  (2008): The phylogenetic problem of Huia (Amphibia: Ranidae). Mol. Phylogenet. Evol. 46(1): 49-60.  PDF fulltext

 
Amphibians of Asia
Amphibian genera